Mohawk Local School District is a public school district in Ohio, United States. It serves students in the villages of Sycamore, Melmore, and McCutchenville, and surrounding rural areas in Wyandot County, Seneca County, and Crawford County.

Grades 9-12
Mohawk High School

Grades 7-8
Mohawk Junior High School (demolished)

Grades K-6
McCutchenville Elementary (demolished)
Melmore Elementary (demolished)
Sycamore Elementary (K-5; demolished)

External links
 

School districts in Ohio
Education in Wyandot County, Ohio